Grevillea macleayana, commonly known as Jervis Bay grevillea, is a species of flowering plant in the family Proteaceae and is endemic to south-eastern New South Wales. It is a spreading shrub with egg-shaped to elliptic, sometimes lobed leaves, and greenish or greyish flowers with a pink to red style.

Description
The lower surface of the leaves is densely covered with soft hairs.

Taxonomy
Jervis Bay grevillea was first formally described in 1986 by Donald McGillivray who gave it the name Grevillea barklyana subsp. macleayana in his book, New Names in Grevillea (Proteaceae), from specimens collected near Bream Beach by Roger Coveny in 1971. In 1994, Peter Olde and Neil Marriott changed the name to Grevillea macleayana in The Grevillea Book. The specific epithet (macleayana) honours William John Macleay.

Distribution and habitat
Grevillea macleayana grows in low woodland or shrubland in near-coastal areas of New South Wales from near Jervis Bay to Moruya, and inland as far as Bundanoon.

References

macleayana
Proteales of Australia
Flora of New South Wales
Taxa named by Donald McGillivray
Plants described in 1986